Jeffrey Allen Bloom is an American film director, film producer, screenwriter and photographer, currently residing in Studio City, California. His film projects include Flowers in the Attic, Nightmares,  Blood Beach and Dogpound Shuffle.

Early life
Bloom was born in New York City, to Sam and Ann Bloom. He is from a close-knit Ukrainian Jewish family. Jeffrey's family made several excursions from one coast to the other, finally settling in Los Angeles where Jeffrey attended John Burroughs Junior High.  They then moved to the San Fernando Valley where Jeffrey attended San Fernando High School.  It was in high school that Jeffrey developed an interest in acting and writing.  He studied acting with the famous acting coach Jeff Corey.  He began writing and supported himself through a variety of jobs, including a stint operating his own hot dog stand.

Jeffrey had a previous encounter with show business.  He was a member of Magicapers, a mid-1950s magic performing group in the art of sleight-of-hand and stage magic. One highlight was a performance at the International Guild of Prestidigiters (IGP) convention in West Hollywood, circa 1955.  Another important event was his adaptation with his cousin Stewart of Houdini's trick, "transformation," in which Houdini locks himself into a steamer trunk.  When the trunk is opened, Houdini has been replaced by a lovely girl.  In Magicaper's performance at John Burroughs, the school librarian was locked in the trunk, and out emerged Tony Curtis, whose younger brother was a student at the school.

Jeffrey pursued writing more and more, and finally his efforts were rewarded by having screen plays accepted, and developing a strong career as a re-write man.  Bloom in later years went on to pursue professional photography and fine furniture making.

Filmography

References

External links

1945 births
Living people
Television producers from California
American television directors
American television writers
Film producers from California
American male writers
Screenwriters from New York (state)
American male screenwriters
Horror film directors
American male television writers
People from Studio City, Los Angeles
Film directors from New York City
American people of Ukrainian-Jewish descent
Film directors from Los Angeles
Television producers from New York City
Film producers from New York (state)
Screenwriters from California